Daniel Bell (born 31 August 1984) is an Australian swimmer born in American Samoa, who has won five Paralympic medals from 2000 to 2008.

Personal

Bell was born in Pago Pago, American Samoa. He was adopted by Liz Bell, a volunteer in a Samoan hospital, at the age of six months. Doctors informed her that he had cerebral palsy and brain damage, and was blind. His adoptive mother brought him back to Ocean Grove, near Geelong, determined to get support for his disabilities. He attended Christian College, Geelong, where he took up swimming. He works as a commercial diver.

On 30 August 2012, he was convicted of stalking and burglary charges to which he had pleaded guilty in the Geelong Magistrates' Court. The charges related to incidents involving two women in December 2011 and January 2012; while they were away from their houses, he trespassed into their bedrooms, took his clothes off, and entered their beds. His defence lawyer stated that the incidents were due to an adverse reaction to a generic drug after being prescribed a brand-name version, and said: "He was hearing voices and ... was no longer in control of himself." He was placed on an 18-month community corrections order that required him to undergo mental health treatment and rehabilitation, along with programs to prevent re-offending.

Career

Bell began his international career with a bronze medal at the 1999 FESPIC Games in Bangkok, Thailand. He competed in five events at the 2000 Sydney Paralympics and one a bronze medal in the men's 4x100 m medley relay 34 pts event.  At the 2004 Athens Games, he won a gold medal in the men's 4 x 100 m medley relay 34 points and three silver medals in the men's 100 m butterfly S10, men's 100 m breaststroke SB9 and men's 4 x 100 m freestyle relay 34 points events.

He was awarded a Medal of the Order of Australia for winning the gold medal, but resigned as a member of the Order and returned the medal on 8 July 2013. He competed in four events at the 2008 Beijing Games but did not win a medal.

At the 2002 IPC Swimming World Championships in Mar Del Plata, Argentina, he won a bronze medal in the men's 100 m butterfly S10 and at the 2006 Championships in Durban, South Africa he won a gold medal in men's 4 x100 m medley relay S34 points.

From 2003 to 2008, he held an Australian Institute of Sport paralympic swimming scholarship. He is coached at Geelong City Aquatic Club by Lucky Weerakkody.

References

Male Paralympic swimmers of Australia
Swimmers at the 2000 Summer Paralympics
Swimmers at the 2004 Summer Paralympics
Swimmers at the 2008 Summer Paralympics
Medalists at the 2000 Summer Paralympics
Medalists at the 2004 Summer Paralympics
Paralympic gold medalists for Australia
Paralympic silver medalists for Australia
Paralympic bronze medalists for Australia
Paralympic medalists in swimming
Medalists at the World Para Swimming Championships
Australian male butterfly swimmers
Australian male breaststroke swimmers
S10-classified Paralympic swimmers
Medal of the Order of Australia forfeitures
Australian adoptees
Australian sportspeople of Samoan descent
American Samoan male swimmers
Sportsmen from Victoria (Australia)
Australian Institute of Sport Paralympic swimmers
Australian blind people
1984 births
Living people